Phelipanche nana is a plant species in the family Orobanchaceae.

Sources

References 

Orobanchaceae
Flora of Malta